Volcán Marmolejo is a  high Pleistocene stratovolcano in the Andes on the border between Argentina and Chile.  It is located  NNE of the active San José volcano, and is the southernmost -plus peak in the world. The Argentine portion is within the Argentinean protection area of Provincial Reserve for Multiple Use and Natural Recreation Manzano / Portillo de Piuquenes. It is on the border of two provinces: Argentinean province of Mendoza and Chilean province of Cordillera. Its slopes are within the administrative boundaries of the two cities: Argentinean city of Tunuyán and the Chilean commune of San José de Maipo.

First ascent 
Marmolejo was first climbed by Hermann Sattler, Sebastian Krückel and Albrecht Maass (Germany) October 1, 1928.

Elevation 
It has an official height of 6108 meters. Other data from available digital elevation models: SRTM yields 6097 metres, ASTER 6103 metres, ALOS 6085 metres and TanDEM-X 6129 metres. The height of the nearest key col is 4005 meters, leading to a topographic prominence of 2103 meters. Marmolejo is considered a Mountain Range according to the Dominance System  and its dominance is 34.43%. Its parent peak is Tupungato and the Topographic isolation is 42.9 kilometers.

See also 

 List of volcanoes in Argentina
 List of volcanoes in Chile

External links
 SI Google Earth Placemarks - Smithsonian Institution Global Volcanism Program: download placemarks with SI  Holocene volcano-data.
 Elevation information about Marmolejo
 Weather Forecast at Marmolejo

References

  (includes Marmolejo)
  (in Spanish; also includes volcanoes of Argentina, Bolivia, and Peru)
 

Volcanoes of Santiago Metropolitan Region
Mountains of Mendoza Province
Mountains of Santiago Metropolitan Region
Volcanoes of Mendoza Province
Six-thousanders of the Andes
Principal Cordillera
Mountains of Argentina
Mountains of Chile
Stratovolcanoes of Argentina
Stratovolcanoes of Chile
Pleistocene stratovolcanoes